Ricardo Jorge Oliveira António (born 6 August 1998), known as Ricardinho, is a Portuguese professional footballer who plays for C.D. Santa Clara as a midfielder.

Club career
Born in Santa Maria da Feira, Aveiro District, Ricardinho played youth football with FC Porto and Rio Ave FC, starting his senior career with the latter's under-23 and reserve teams. He joined C.D. Santa Clara in 2019, and shortly after went on successive loans with third division clubs S.C. Praiense and S.C.U. Torreense.

Ricardinho returned to the Estádio de São Miguel for the 2021–22 season. He made his professional debut on 1 August 2021 in the second round of the Taça da Liga against S.C. Farense, as a 76th-minute substitute for Carlos; his team won on a penalty shootout after a 0–0 away draw. His Primeira Liga bow was a 3–0 loss at C.D. Tondela a week later, also off the bench. His first professional goal was on 26 October, in a 3–1 win over FC Porto in the League Cup.

Ricardinho scored for the first time in the Portuguese top flight on 7 January 2022, closing the 3–2 home defeat of Sporting CP shortly after having replaced Crysan.

References

External links

1998 births
Living people
Sportspeople from Santa Maria da Feira
Portuguese footballers
Association football midfielders
Primeira Liga players
Campeonato de Portugal (league) players
Padroense F.C. players
Rio Ave F.C. players
C.D. Santa Clara players
S.C. Praiense players
S.C.U. Torreense players